The Cathedral of St. Joseph  also called St. Joseph's Church is the name given to a historic Catholic church, located in Tsukiji area, Tokyo, Japan. The temple was consecrated in honor of St. Joseph. It stands out as the first Catholic church in Tokyo.

The church was founded by missionaries of the Paris Foreign Missions Society, which was established in Tokyo in 1871. On July 2, 1874, they bought a 900 square metre piece of land from the Japanese government and began construction, which was completed on November 22 of the same year. After this, the church became the center of Catholic missionaries who worked in Japan, especially in the north of Tokyo. In 1874, the bishop of Tokyo gave the church the status of cathedral and seat of the Apostolic Vicariate of Northern Japan (now called Archdiocese of Tokyo). In December 1874 began a restructuring of the temple, which ended on November 15, 1878.

The Church of St. Joseph was the cathedral until 1920, when the local bishop moved to St. Mary's Cathedral, Tokyo.

See also
Roman Catholicism in Japan

References

Roman Catholic cathedrals in Japan
Churches in Tokyo
Roman Catholic churches completed in 1874
19th-century Roman Catholic church buildings in Japan
1874 establishments in Japan